Verband für das Deutsche Hundewesen (VDH) is Germany's Kennel club for dogs and represents Germany in the world federation Fédération Cynologique Internationale. It is headquartered in Dortmund, Germany.

As the country-wide controlling body, the VDH represents 167 member organizations with more than 650,000 members.  In addition, there are over 250 different breeds of dog in the VDH.

History
On July 16, 1906, the :de:Kartell der Stammbuchführender Spezialklubs für Jagd- und Nutzhunde was founded as the second German umbrella organization alongside the delegate commission; first president was :de:Albert de Gingins. In 1914, the cartel changed its name to "Kartell der Rassezuchtvereine und allgemeine Verbände" and in 1925 to "Deutsches Kartell für Hundewesen" (DKH). After Hitler's seizure of power in 1933, the Reichsverband für die Deutsche Hundewesen (RDH) was established as a "unitary organization" and the German Cartel for Dogs, Delegates Commission and Association of Clubs for Examination of working dogs for hunting  were incorporated into these. The breed breeding societies became student councils. Hans Glockner is appointed chairman by the Reich Sportführer. In 1934 Glockner was elected by the FCI as its president. In 1937, the Reichsverband, from which the hunting federations had been separated, became the Reichsfachgruppe Deutsches Hundewesen e.V. in the Reichsverband Deutscher Kleintierzüchter e.V. Managing Director of the RDH Konrad Most was appointed in 1933 to the Reichsabrichtewart für Diensthunde. In 1939 the RDH was spun off from the Reichsverband Deutscher Kleintierzüchter and became independent as the 'Reichsverband für Hundewesen e.V.' (RH). This was placed under the supervision of the High Command of the Army. In 1941, the RH resigned from the FCI.

Until 1941, :de:Arno Manthey was president of the Reichsverband, after whose death Forstmeister Mueller was appointed president of the RH in November by order of Reichsführer SS and the dog trade of SS.

After the dissolution of the Reichsverband für Hundewesen, ordered by the Allies, on 1 January 1946 was his board member Franz Bazille (1933 Reichsausstellungswart in the RDH) involved in the founding of the VDH on June 11, 1949. The former managing director of the "German Cartel for Dogs" from 1933 Franz Bazille was appointed honorary president in 1952 and remained that until his death on 12 October 1952.

Function 
The Association for the German Canine Dog represents Germany in the Fédération Cynologique Internationale.
As an umbrella organization of nationwide 176 member organizations (pedigree breed clubs and dog sport clubs), the VDH represents more than 650,000 members. Over 250 different dog breeds are looked after in the breeding clubs of the VDH.

The member associations of the VDH are the 16 VDH regional federations, 156 breed dog breeding societies as well as the German dog sport federation and the German federation of the working dog sport clubs German association of the working dog sport federations. In addition there are the extraordinary members of the :de:Jagdgesichtshundverband (JGHV), which is responsible for the testing of hunting dogs, and two greyhound racing clubs.

In the breeding books of the member clubs in 2017 75,621 puppies were registered - bred according to the breeding regulations of the VDH and with appropriate throwing controls. According to the VDH, pedigrees of the VDH should ensure that the information contained therein is correct and that strict litter and breeding controls have been carried out.

Breeder 
According to the VDH, about 8,000 breeders are organized in 156 breeding clubs. For the breeding of dogs in the VDH there is a breeding order, which sets minimum requirements for the breeding, whose adherence is controlled. In addition, there are special breeding programs, the hereditary diseases of breed dogs to push back. the consortium of breed clubs (the working dog breeds) and utility dog associations (AZG). Their original task was to promote the Dienstgebrauchshundwesens, he working dog being in the VDH was their responsibility. Only clubs in the AZG were allowed to issue certificates of performance / performance certificates in the VDH and to carry out examinations with the awarding of recognized training marks, in particular the  Versatility Test for Working Dogs . In the AZG is since 1998

Their original task was the promotion of service dog, the working dog being in the VDH was their responsibility. Only clubs in the AZG were allowed to issue certificates of performance / performance certificates in the VDH and to carry out examinations with the awarding of recognized training signs, in particular the Vielseitigkeitsprüfung für Gebrauchshunde.

In the AZG is since 1998 The :de:Begleithundprüfung  ie compulsory examination, ie condition for participation in Dog sports. In 2008, AZG members had about 5000 practice sites in Germany.

In the meantime VDH there are separate committees for the different sports. The abbreviation AZG is used for the committee for the working dog being.

Association of breeding clubs and working dog associations 
The VDH existed since September 30, 1956 the Arbeitsgemeinschaft der Zuchtvereine(working group of breeding societies)  (the Working dog ) and utility dog associations (AZG). Their original task was to promote the working dog being in the VDH was their responsibility. Only clubs in the AZG were allowed to issue certificates of performance / performance certificates in the VDH and carry out examinations with the award of recognized training signs, in particular the Vielseitigkeitsprüfung für Gebrauchshunde. In the AZG is since 1998 The :de:Begleithundprüfung compulsory examination, ie condition for participation in dog sports.  In 2008, the AZG members had about 5000 practice sites in Germany.

Members of the AZG:

 Allegeminer Deutscher Rottweiler-Klub
 Boxer-Klub
 Internationaler Boxer Klub
 Deutscher Bouvier-Club von 1977 (Bouvier des Ardennes and Bouvier des Flandres)
 :de:Deutscher Hundesportverband
 Deutscher Malinois Club
 Dobermann-Verein
 :de:Klub für Terrier
 Pinscher-Schnauzer-Klub 1895
 Rassezuchtverein für Hovawart-Hunde
 :de:Verein für Deutsche Schäferhunde

The VDH now has its own committees for the various sports. The abbreviation AZG is used for the "Committee for the Working Dog".

Literature 
 Anne Dreesbach, Britta Kägler, Susanne Vers: Geschichte der Hunde. Vom Kaiserreich bis heute. 100 Jahre VDH. Kosmos (Franckh-Kosmos), Stuttgart 2007, .

References

External links

Organizations established in 1949
Fédération Cynologique Internationale
Kennel clubs
Dortmund
1949 establishments in Germany
Dog breeds originating in Germany